
Russell City (also known as Russell) was an unincorporated community in Alameda County, California, United States, about  south of Oakland in present-day Hayward. The land is at an elevation of 16 feet (5 m). Russell City existed from 1853 until 1964, when the last of the residents were forced out to make way for an industrial park, with such parks dominating the area to this day. While the residents fought removal, many of the buildings were destroyed in arson fires.

History
According to sources including the City of Hayward's website, Russell City was named in 1853 after Joel Russell, a New England teacher who came to California during the Gold Rush. Some sources say the area was named after Frederick James Russell, who laid out the town in 1907. 

Russell City was an arrival point for immigrants to the San Francisco Bay Area, initially inhabited primarily by Danish immigrants. By World War II, it was home to many African Americans and to many Latinos from Mexico and Puerto Rico, some braceros and others shipyard workers at Todd Shipyards and Kaiser Shipyards in Richmond. Ernesto Nava, son of the Mexican revolutionary leader Pancho Villa, lived in Russell City and was one of the last residents to leave. The town's largest growth period came during and after the war, with significant numbers of African Americans moving there from the South. The town had a history of blues music, and this heritage is the basis for the annual Hayward/Russell City Blues Festival. 

After Alameda County declined to annex Russell City and provide sanitation and fire services, Hayward declared the community blighted in the late 1950s, when it occupied 12 square blocks and had approximately 1,400 residents. In the early 1960s, the city began purchasing properties and there was a spate of arson fires. In 1964, the town was annexed by Hayward, the remaining residents evicted under eminent domain, and the land used for an industrial park, with the last town buildings being cleared in 1966. A mural at A Street and Maple Court in Hayward commemorates Russell City. The City of Hayward issued a formal apology on November 16, 2021, and launched the Russell City Restorative Justice Project in June 2022.

Russell City Energy Center

The Russell City Energy Center, a natural gas fueled power plant, opened in 2013 within the city's former boundaries.

References

Further reading

External links

Former settlements in Alameda County, California
Geography of Hayward, California
Ghost towns in the San Francisco Bay Area
Populated places established in 1853
African-American history in the San Francisco Bay Area